Rev. John Frederic Dawson LL.B. (1802 – 11 October 1870 Clapham, Bedfordshire)  was an English entomologist and taxonomist from 'The Woodlands' near Bedford best known for his work on the Carabidae beetles "Geodephaga Britannica; a Monograph of the Carnivorous Ground-Beetles indigenous to the British Isles" (London, 1854). He became a member of the Entomological Society of London in 1852,  and was mainly active in Dorset and the Isle of Wight. He obtained a Bachelor of Civil Law degree from Trinity College in July 1827.

He was the son of John Thomas Dawson, former Mayor of Bedford, and Mary Higson Leach, who were married at Goldington church. John Frederic was twice married – his first wife Hester Wade-Gery (1804–1860), whom he married on 1 May 1827, producing a son, William Henry Dawson. After his first wife's death John Frederic married his housekeeper, Alice Procter, and fathered a son, John Frederic, who was baptised at Clapham in 1864. and a daughter, Ada Eliza Dawson, later the wife of Henry Fuller. In his will he left an annuity to his first son William, the estate of Woodlands to the second son, and amply provided for his widow, Alice, who was later recorded as living at 1 Vernon Terrace, Brighton, Sussex.

The London Standard of 27 September 1876, says: "Much excitement was caused yesterday morning in the village of Clapham, near Bedford, by the exhumation of the remains of Rev. John Frederic Dawson, LL.B., of Woodlands in that parish, who died in October, 1870, at the age of sixty-eight, and who was buried in the parish churchyard. It would appear that in 1812 the state of Woodlands...."   John Frederic Dawson was buried in the churchyard of the Church of Saint Thomas à Becket in Clapham, Bedfordshire.

From the records it appears that Rev. Dawson kept a well-stocked wine cellar; in 1859 one of his staff, Charles Gascoin, was brought before the court accused of stealing 30 gallons of wine. He had helped stack more than 27 dozen bottles of port and sherry and over the course of some 15 months had pilfered from the cellar.

External links 
A review of "Geodephaga Britannica; a Monograph of the Carnivorous Ground-Beetles indigenous to the British Isles"
Clerical errors
Baptism records
Records pertaining to John Frederic Dawson
Woodlands Manor

References 

English entomologists
English taxonomists